Somerton railway station may refer to:

Somerton station, on the SEPTA West Trenton Line in Philadelphia, Pennsylvania, United States
Somerton railway station, Melbourne, Australia, now replaced by Roxburgh Park
Somerton railway station, a former station in Somerset, England
Fritwell & Somerton railway station, a former station in Oxfordshire, England